Alcedo is a genus of birds in the kingfisher subfamily Alcedininae. The genus was introduced by Carl Linnaeus in 1758 in the 10th edition of his Systema Naturae. The type species is the common kingfisher (Alcedo ispida, now Alcedo atthis ispida). Alcedo is the Latin for "kingfisher".

Species
The genus contains the following eight species:

Unlike many kingfishers, all members of Alcedo are specialist fish-eaters. They all have some blue feathers on their upper-parts and most species have a black bill. Except for the cerulean kingfisher they all have some rufous in their plumage. The female generally has more red on the lower mandible than the male.

References

Sources

External links

 
Bird genera
Taxonomy articles created by Polbot